Roya Toloui (born May 22, 1966, in Baneh, Kurdistan Province, Iran) is a prominent Kurdish-Iranian journalist, human rights activist and feminist, currently residing in the US. She was born in Baneh in western Iran. She received her high school diploma at Baneh and her PhD in Medical laboratory from University of Mashad.

Life 
She was the editor-in-chief of Rasan (Rising up), a Kurdish monthly magazine about women's issues. Five issues of the magazine were published in Sanandaj in spring and summer of 2005 until it was closed down in the summer of 2005 by the Iranian judiciary. She is the founder of the Association of the Kurdish Women Supporting Peace in Kurdistan. She is also a member of the Kurdish PEN.

Due to her outspoken criticism of authorities as well as defense of the rights of Kurdish and Iranian women, she was tried in a Revolutionary Court in April 2005 and was accused of endangering national security.

Following demonstrations in Kurdish inhabited areas of western Iran, she was arrested on 2 August 2005, and held in prison for 66 days until freed on bail in October 2005. Her case of imprisonment was highlighted in the International PEN's Day of the Imprisoned Writer in November 2005. After her release, she fled Iran for Turkey and finally she sought refuge in the United States in April 2006. In 2006, she received the Oxfam Novib/PEN Award.

References

External links
Amnesty International's Report, August 2005   
Imprisonment of Roya Toloui   
UNHCR- Amnesty International Report May 2006 - Iran.
About Roya Toloui in Radio Free Europe   
Dr. Toloui arrives in US

1966 births
Living people
Iranian democracy activists
Iranian dissidents
Iranian feminists
Iranian journalists
Iranian Kurdish women
Iranian women's rights activists
Iranian Kurdish feminists
People from Baneh
Ferdowsi University of Mashad alumni